The 2nd White Cloth hall  was a marketplace for the sale of undyed cloth in Holbeck, Leeds, West Yorkshire, England.

It was built south of the river, between Meadow Lane and Hunslet Lane in 1756 to replace the 1st White Cloth Hall of 1711. The 2nd cloth hall was much larger than its predecessor but it only served 20 years until the construction of the enormous 3rd White Cloth Hall.

The building was demolished in 1786, only 30 years after its construction. The only part of the building to survive was the cupola which was transferred to the 3rd White Cloth Hall.

See also
1st White Cloth Hall
3rd White Cloth Hall
4th White Cloth Hall

References

Buildings and structures in Leeds
Demolished buildings and structures in England
Buildings and structures demolished in 1786